China Slaver is a 1929 American pre-Code action film produced by Trinity Pictures. Directed by Frank Mattison and written by Cecil Hill and L. V. Jefferson based on a story by Calvin Holivey and Rupert Hughes, the film features a cast that includes Sôjin Kamiyama, Albert Valentino, Iris Yamaoka, Ben Wilson, Jimmy Aubrey, and James Leong. The storyline involves a Chinese spy who is sent to infiltrate a remote island that is suspected to have become a hotbed of narcotics and white slavery under the rule of a tyrannical Chinese criminal. The film received generally lukewarm reviews from critics, although Sojin's performance in particular was praised.

Cast
 Sôjin Kamiyama as Ming Foy/Wing Foy/The Cobra
 Albert Valentino as Mark Conover
 Iris Yamaoka (or Iris Shan) as Foo
 Ben Wilson as Sam Warren
 Jimmy Aubrey as Willie Kegg
 James Leong as Lee Mandarin

Production
The project was first announced in December 1928, after Albert Valentino announced his participation in the film alongside Sojin; Trinity Pictures acquired distribution rights, with the film's release date set at January 25, 1929. Touting its noteworthy cast, the film was marketed as "the year's most exciting melodrama".

Reception
A reviewer for Photoplay described China Slaver as a "rather ragged production attempting epical heights", but "handicapped by an overly-fantastic story and amateur direction." However, he also lauded Sojin for his "excellent" and "inscrutable" performance.

References

External links
 
 

1929 films
American action films
1920s action films
American black-and-white films
Films directed by Frank S. Mattison
1920s American films
1920s English-language films